A picture frame is a protective and decorative edging for a picture, such as a painting or photograph. It makes displaying the work safer and easier and both sets the picture apart from its surroundings and aesthetically integrates it with them.

Construction
A picture frame is a container that borders the perimeter of a picture, and is used for the protection, display, and visual appreciation of objects and imagery such as photographs, canvas paintings, drawings and prints, posters, mirrors, shadow box memorabilia, and textiles.

Traditionally picture frames have been made of wood, and it remains very popular because wood frames can provide strength, be shaped in a broad range of profiles, and allow a variety of surface treatments. Other materials include metals, e.g. silver, bronze, aluminum, and stiff plastics such as polystyrene. A frame surface may be of any color or texture. Both genuine gilding and imitation gold remain popular, although many other surfaces are to be found in most framing establishments. Some picture frames have elaborate moldings, which may refer to the subject matter. Intricate decorations are often made of molded, then gilded plaster over a wood base. Picture frame mouldings come in a wide variety of profiles, generally in some sort of L shape with an upward "lip" and a horizontal rabbet. The rabbet functions as a shelf to hold the frame glazing (if any is to be used), some sort of spacer or mat/matte to keep the object safely behind the inner surface of the glazing, the object itself, and backing boards to protect the object from physical damage and environmental pollutants. The lip extends a proportionate distance up from the edge of the rabbet. It restrains  materials in the frame and can be used to help set off or reveal the picture aesthetically.

The picture frame may contain a protective "glazing" of picture framing glass or acrylic sheet, e.g. Acrylite or Plexiglas. If the art in the frame is considered dispensable or if the exhibition environment is highly controlled, no glazing may be used. Since the 1980s significant advances have been made in the manufacture of picture glazings, creating a much broader range of options in both glass and acrylic products. Choosing which to use requires taking into account a variety of each object's characteristics: size, media used, condition of media, perceived value of object, anticipated use of the object, e.g. extended exhibition periods or travel. It is wise to consult an experienced art framer or conservator for help in making the better choice. Now, both picture framing glass and acrylic sheet are available with anti-reflective coatings to make the glazing virtually invisible under most lighting conditions. Except for pictures of only temporary interest, glazing should incorporate a filter to block almost all ultraviolet radiation (a UV filter) from penetrating the glazing. This filter slows the photocatalytic degradation of organic materials in the picture. Both glass and acrylic glazings are available with built-in anti-static properties. This option is necessary for objects with friable or degraded media, which would be pulled off the object and onto the glazing by static electric forces. 

Except for the most disposable or temporary displays, the glazing must be held off the surface of the picture in order to prevent the object from becoming adhered to the underside of the glazing, acquiring irreversible color changes due to compression of the media, and/or developing mold growths that otherwise would not occur. This distancing is accomplished with a mat, "spacers" tucked behind the glazing and hidden from view by the lip of the moulding, shadowboxing, sandwiching the glazing between two mouldings, and similar methods. Relieving the glazing is also necessary in order to prevent loose media, such as charcoal or pastel, from becoming smudged.

The treatment of the back of the framed artwork also varies widely. All frame packages should incorporate some sort of stiff, dense board to protect against physical blows and the ingress of dirt, insects, moisture, and pollutants. Except for temporary displays of expendable objects, the backboard(s) should be made from good archival-quality material, such as matboard. Archival-quality corrugated boards, both paper and plastic, are sometimes used, and foam-core boards that are described as being archival quality are also used. As with many details of good framing, the advice of an expert is valuable.

Behind the backing board(s), retaining clips or brads hold the package in place, mirroring the restraint provided by the lip of the moulding at the front of the frame. A dust seal (usually sturdy archival-quality paper) is adhered, over the back of the moulding.  While these are almost invariably simply functional, there are examples of works in which they have been decorated and considered part of the artwork. Finally, hanging loops or similar attachments are securely screwed to the left and right sides of the molding.

Shapes

Picture frames are generally square or rectangular, though circular and oval frames are not uncommon. Frames in more unusual shapes such as football shapes, stars, hearts can be hand carved by a professional wood carver or carpenter (or possibly molded out of wood pulp). There are also picture frames designed to go around corners. A popular design is the scoop, an indent in the frame adding depth.

History

The earliest frames are thought to be those that surrounded fayum mummy portraits. The stucco frames may have been used to hang the portraits in the owner's home until the time of death, at which point the portrait would have been placed over the mummy. Another theory is that the portraits were painted close to death and were carried around the city in a funeral procession before the body was taken to the embalmer.

Although framing borders in ancient art were used to divide scenes and ornamentation by ancient Egyptian and Greek artists in pottery and wallpaintings, the first carved wooden frames as we know them today appeared on small panel paintings in twelfth and thirteenth century Europe. According to a historical series published in Picture Frame Magazine, these early "framed panel paintings were made from one piece. The area to be painted was carved out, leaving a raised framing border around the outside edge, like a tray. The whole piece was then gessoed and gilded. Painting the image on the flat panel was the last thing to be done."

When it was realized this method of producing a frame and the image within in one slab of wood was too costly, "a more efficient method was eventually developed which used mitred moulding strips. These strips were attached to a flat wooden panel which produced a similar result to the carved panel, but were more cost effective. This type of frame is known as an engaged frame. The early ones were made of simple wooden moulding strips attached to the outside edge of a wooden panel."

Throughout the 14th and 15th centuries, most European frames were church-commissioned and largely unmovable as they were altarpieces and a large part of the church's architecture. The frames were ornamented with architectural elements mimicking the exteriors of the great cathedrals. However, the Italian Renaissance of the 14th and 15th centuries saw the rise of arts patrons extending beyond the church. Wealthy nobles such as the Medici family could now bring art and frames into their estate by commissioning allegorical, devotional and portrait paintings. This was the advent of the portable or moveable frame. Gentile da Fabriano’s Adoration of the Magi (1423) is the first altarpiece made with panel and frame in two separate pieces, making it the first independent frame as we know it today.

Under the reign of Francis I, France's first Renaissance monarch from 1515 through 1547, art came to the forefront of daily life and flourished along with picture frames. Many workers came from Italy to the arts trade, including Leonardo da Vinci, whom "Francis convinced to leave Italy in the last part of his life." Frames were now designed by furniture builders rather than the artist, sculptor or architect as in the past. Books on furniture and interior design were published and in distribution to a wider market than ever before.

From 1610 to 1643, under the reign of Louis XIII in France, the influence of court and refinement took center stage in frame designs. The profiles became thinner than their Italian predecessors, and continuous design such as egg-and-dart, ribbon and flow of leaves, and pronounced low relief corner designs appeared. This paved the way for Baroque design in picture framing, and "Spanish, Flemish, and Italian influences were all at work to produce a curious intermingling and exchange of ideas."

Pictures frames as art were highly developed in Orthodox countries (e.g., Russia, Serbia) and used to cover icons in churches. The earliest American frames, known as American Empire Style Frames, are very spare and utilitarian. They are similar to the simple cove or scoop in wall molding found in colonial architecture.

Styles
"L"-style frames are a simple variety that are constructed with a single L-shaped border of wood, with the bottom part of the L, or rabbet, at the front of the frame to hold in the glass, object and backing, which are secured in from the back

A photo cube is a special type of picture frame, often used to show members of a family, a vacation, or a timeline of someone's life.

Other styles are clip frames (not really a frame at all), box frames and shadow boxes. A digital photo frame is an example of the changing technology of the 21st century.

Macaroni picture frames are a popular craft project for children. Uncooked pasta in various shapes are glued to a frame in a pattern. Sometimes the entire frame is painted.

Plique-à-jour picture frames are made of enamel.

Some contemporary painters and photographers who work on canvas "gallery-wrap" their artwork, i.e. extend the image around the edges of the stretched canvas, thereby precluding use of a traditional frame. In those instances, the object may be mounted so it floats visually within the protective surround. Joan Miró once made a work specifically in order to frame it with a flea market frame.

Alternatives
As good picture frames can be expensive, some people find previously used frames, remove the pictures within, and reuse the frames.

Block mounting is a cheap alternative to framing. The technique (also known as display mounting, photo mounting or art mounting) involves sealing high quality photographic prints onto a wooden MDF board.
The process of creating one is as follows:
 The digital image or artwork is uploaded.
 The block mounting company prints the image onto photographic paper with a finish (either matt or glossy).
 The print is adhered securely onto an MDF wooden board with black edging, using a vacuum press and heat seal glue.
 The image is laminated, packaged and delivered.

See also

 Lightbox, a cube-shaped box used for taking photos, also called photo cube
 Gallery wrap
 Fillet (picture framing)
 Gold leaf
 Silver leaf (art)
 Diasec
 Fine Art Trade Guild
 Professional Picture Framers Association (PPFA)
 Zhuangbiao

References

External links

 Art of the Picture Frame Resources from the National Portrait Gallery.
 PPFA-Professional Picture Framers Association
Frames in the Robert Lehman Collection, a 2007 collection catalog containing information on European and American frames.
 Renaissance Frames, a 1990 exhibition catalog from the Metropolitan Museum of Art libraries.

 Schmitz Compendium of European Picture Frames: 1730–1930, Solingen, 2012: www.schmitzrahmen.de

 
Painting